Drive is a 2011 American action drama film directed by Nicolas Winding Refn and written by Hossein Amini, based on the 2005 novel Drive by James Sallis. The film stars Ryan Gosling as an unnamed Hollywood stunt driver moonlighting as a getaway driver, whose budding relationship with his neighbor Irene (Carey Mulligan) and her young son Benicio is interrupted by the sudden release of her husband Standard (Oscar Isaac) from prison. Debt-ridden, Standard hires him to take part in what turns out to be a botched, million-dollar heist that endangers their lives. Bryan Cranston, Christina Hendricks, Ron Perlman, and Albert Brooks play supporting roles. The film premiered on May 11 in competition at the 2011 Cannes Film Festival, before being released by FilmDistrict in American theaters on September 16. Drive earned a worldwide total of $76.1 million on a production budget of $15 million. The review-aggregation website Rotten Tomatoes surveyed 258 reviews and judged 92 percent to be positive.

Drive earned various awards and nominations, with particular praise for its direction, sound design, and score. Refn garnered the Best Director Award during the film's run at Cannes. Sound editors Lon Bender and Victor Ray Ennis earned a nomination for Best Sound Editing at the 84th Academy Awards, and production designer Beth Mickle for Excellence in Production Design for a Contemporary Film at the 16th Art Directors Guild Awards. It won all three nominations awarded by the Austin Film Critics Association, including Best Director (Refn) and Best Adapted Screenplay (Amini). The film earned four nominations at the 65th British Academy Film Awards, and won a single category out of its eight nominations at the 17th Critics' Choice Awards: Best Action Movie. The Chicago Film Critics Association gave its Best Original Score award to composer Cliff Martinez, who also garnered two nominations at the 12th World Soundtrack Academy: Best Soundtrack of the Year and Soundtrack Composer of the Year.

The cast also received numerous acting accolades, with Brooks garnering the most nominations from critics' organizations. He won Best Supporting Actor awarded by the National Society of Film Critics, and was nominated in the same category at the 69th Golden Globe Awards. Mulligan won the Supporting Actress Award at the Hollywood Film Awards, both for her performance in the film as well as in Shame. The film earned eight nominations at the 16th Satellite Awards, winning four: Best Director (Refn), Best Actor in a Motion Picture (Gosling), Best Actor in a Supporting Role (Brooks), and Best Sound (Bender, Ennis, Dave Patterson, and Robert Fernandez). Some critics' organization selected Drive as one of their top ten films of the year, including the National Board of Review.

Accolades

See also
 2011 in film

Notes

References

External links
 

Lists of accolades by film